Equitas Small Finance Bank (erstwhile Equitas Microfinance Ltd) is a small finance bank founded in 2016 as a microfinance lender. The bank has its headquarters in Chennai, and is a subsidiary of holding company Equitas Holdings Ltd.

History
After receiving license from the Reserve Bank of India (RBI) on 30 June 2016, Equitas Small Finance bank began banking on 5 September 2016. With effect from 4 February 2017, Equitas became a scheduled bank. However, the company failed to meet the RBI's mandate of listing within three years of starting operations. A review from the Securities and Exchange Board of India and RBI is awaited.

Operations 
The bank planned to build a network of 412 branches located in 11 Indian states by the end of fiscal year 2016-17. However, for rendering technology oriented services, 83% of transactions occurring online as of July 2017. This includes the bank providing an RFID sticker to pay road tolls automatically, with settlements occurring digitally.

On 1 March 2018, the bank was penalized ₹1 million (US$ thousand) by the Reserve Bank of India for rolling out investment, pension, and insurance services without obtaining prior approval.

The bank became a public company via an initial public offering (IPO) in October 2020.

In 2021, Equitas Small Finance Bank partnered with the neobanking company Niyo to launch a mobile banking platform called NiyoX.

On 23 November 2021, the bank announced its partnership with HDFC Bank, for a co-branded credit card. 

In 2021, the boards of both Equitas Small Finance Bank and its holding company, Equitas Holding Company, approved a reverse merger between the two companies.

Philanthropy
Equitas Microfinance Ltd established Equitas Development Initiatives Trust (EDIT) in 2008 to provide social services. In 2018, the bank committed 5% of profits to EDIT.

EDIT established Equitas Gurukul Matriculation Schools in 2010. By 2017, the schools were employing 400 people, and educating 5,700 students primarily from backgrounds that offered limited opportunities. EDIT also has a programme called Equitas Bird's Nest that seeks to help impoverished pavement dwellers. In March 2018, EDIT celebrated the milestone of improving the quality of life for 1,300 families in Chennai through this programme.

See also

 Banking in India
 List of banks in India
 Indian Financial System Code

References

External links 
 

Small finance banks
Financial services companies based in Chennai
Banks established in 2007
Indian companies established in 2007
Private sector banks in India
2007 establishments in Tamil Nadu
Companies listed on the National Stock Exchange of India
Companies listed on the Bombay Stock Exchange